Eleftherios "Lefteris" Kakiousis (born 7 June 1968 in Thessaloniki, Greece) is a former Greek professional basketball player, as well as a coach and executive. During his playing career, he played at the point guard and shooting guard positions.

Playing career

Clubs
Kakiousis began his professional club club career in 1987, with the Greek club Iraklis Thessaloniki. His moved to the Greek club PAOK Thessaloniki in 1997. With PAOK, he won the Greek Cup title in 1999. He finished his playing career with the Greek club Makedonikos.

Greece national team
With the senior Greek national team, Kakiousis played at the 1993 EuroBasket, the 1995 EuroBasket, and the 1996 Summer Olympic Games. In total, he represented Greece at the senior level in 44 games, in which he averaged 3.6 points per game.

Coaching career
Kakiousis began his club coaching career, as the head coach of the Greek club Makedonikos in 2001. With Makedonikos, he won the Greek 2nd Division championship, with a 24–2 record in the 2001–02 season. In 2002, he joined Iraklis Thessaloniki, and he led the club a third-place finish in the Greek Basket League's 2003–04 season. In 2005, he became the head coach of AEK Athens, and in 2006, he became the assistant coach of Maroussi Athens. In 2009, he once again took the head coaching job with Iraklis.

Kakiousis was also an assistant coach for the senior men's Greek national teamss that won the gold medal at 2005 EuroBasket, and the silver medal at the 2006 FIBA World Championship.

Awards and accomplishments

Player
Greek Cup Winner: (1999)
2× Greek League All-Star: (1996 I, 1996 II)

Head coach
Greek 2nd Division Champion: (2002)

Assistant coach
2005 EuroBasket:  
2006 FIBA World Championship:

References

External links
FIBA Euroleague Profile
FIBA Archive Profile

AEK Athens Profile
Draftexpress.com Profile
Hellenic Basketball Federation Profile 

1968 births
Living people
AEK B.C. coaches
Basketball players at the 1996 Summer Olympics
Basketball players from Thessaloniki
Greek basketball coaches
Greek basketball executives and administrators
Greek Basket League players
Greek men's basketball players
Iraklis Thessaloniki B.C. coaches
Iraklis Thessaloniki B.C. players
Makedonikos B.C. coaches
Makedonikos B.C. players
Olympic basketball players of Greece
P.A.O.K. BC players
Point guards
Shooting guards